Between Today and Yesterday is an autobiographical album released in 1974 by singer songwriter Alan Price.

In its original LP format, Side One was titled "Yesterday" and Side Two was titled "Today."  The "Yesterday" side featured six songs about the working class environment, in Northern England, in which Price was raised.  Musically, these songs drew heavily from pre-rock styles, bringing to mind the music of the music hall and working class anthems. The "Today" side contained six songs about the more modern Price, performed in a more contemporary style.

The title track was written for the unreleased album Savaloy Dip, which was recorded prior to that but released in 2016.

The album was a commercial and critical success.

Track listing
All songs written by Alan Price.

"Left Over People" – 2:57
"Away, Away" – 2:54
"Between Today and Yesterday" – 4:28
"In Times Like These" – 2:39
"Under the Sun" – 4:37
"Jarrow Song" – 5:45
"City Lights" – 4:40
"Look at My Face" – 2:49
"Angel Eyes" – 3:13
"You're Telling Me" – 5:37
"Dream of Delight" – 3:33
"Between Today and Yesterday" – 4:25

The 2003 compact disc release includes the following bonus tracks:

"Jarrow Song" (single version) – 4:37
"In Times Like These" (single version) – 2:35
"Sell, Sell, Sell" – 3:58
"Between Today and Yesterday '86" – 3:48
"Jarrow Song '86" – 3:36

Personnel

Musicians
 Alan Price – organ, piano, keyboards, vocals
 Colin Green –  guitar
 Dave Markee – bass guitar, double bass
 Clive Thacker – drums
 Derek Wadsworth – orchestration

Technical
 Alan Price – producer
 Bob Fisher – mastering
 Keith Grant – engineer
 David Hamilton-Smith – assistant engineer
 Barbara Brunsdon – cover illustration 
 Seabrook Graves Aslett – sleeve art
 Richie Unterberger – liner notes (2003 CD)

References

1974 albums
Alan Price albums
Warner Records albums